Derek Clendening (born November 18, 1981 in Fort Erie, Ontario) is a Canadian writer who primarily focuses on horror fiction and related non-fiction.

With Dark Scribe Magazine he has published numerous interviews with notable horror authors such as Joe Nassise and Greg Lamberson. His story Season's Tickets" was published in Blood Lite 2 from Pocketbooks.

Fiction 
"Season's Tickets" Blood Lite 2 ed. Kevin J Anderson, Pocketbooks (2010)

Non-Fiction 
"Robert Dunbar: Literary Patience and The Pines" March 2009 Dark Scribe Magazine

"Wrath James White: Of Gore and Grotesqueries" December 2008 Dark Scribe Magazine

"Edward Lee: Deconstructing Market Expectations" October 2008 Dark Scribe Magazine

"Richard's Reconstruction: Kelly Laymon Revisits The Woods Are Dark" August 2008 Dark Scribe Magazine

"Of Sequels and Success: An Interview with Mary San Giovanni" July 2008 Dark Scribe Magazine

"Secret Minds of Editors" July 2008 Dark Scribe Magazine

"Of Terrors and Translations: An Interview with Joe Nassise" June 2008 Dark Scribe Magazine

"Lunch with Lamberson: A Conversation with Buffalo's Slime Guy" May 2008 Dark Scribe Magazine

References 
http://kjablog.com/?p=610
http://www.darkscribemagazine.com/editorial-staff/derek-clendening-contributing-scribe.html
http://www.wilywriters.com/blog/?p=909
http://www.goodreads.com/author/show/3262493.Derek_Clendening
http://www.scstandard.com/Calendar/Info.aspx?c=12593&calsel=10%2F29%2F2008

External links 
 darkscribemagazine.com
 kjablog.com

1981 births
Living people
Canadian horror writers
People from Fort Erie, Ontario
Postmodern writers